Maj James Ian Morrison, 2nd Baron Margadale TD DL (17 July 1930 – 6 April 2003) was a British peer.

Morrison was the son of Major John Morrison, 1st Baron Margadale and the Honourable Margaret Esther Lucie Smith. He married Clare Barclay, daughter of Anthony Lister Barclay, on 14 October 1952. They had three children:

Hon. Fiona Elizabeth Morrison (born 1954), married Hugh Trenchard, 3rd Viscount Trenchard in 1975 and had four children.
Alastair Morrison, 3rd Baron Margadale (born 4 April 1958), married Lady Sophia Cavendish in 1988 and had two children.
Hon. Hugh ("Hughie") Morrison (born 1960), married Jane Jenks in 1986 and had two children.

After Ludgrove and Eton he attended the Royal Agricultural College. He was commissioned into the Life Guards in 1949 before transferring into the Royal Wiltshire Yeomanry and reaching the rank of Major in 1964.  He was a member of Wiltshire County Council in 1955 and again from 1973 to 1977, as well as chairman of the West Wiltshire Conservative Association from 1967 to 1971. He went on to be appointed as Honorary Colonel of the Royal Wiltshire Yeomanry in 1982 and then of the Royal Wessex Yeomanry from 1984 until 1989.

The family seat is the Fonthill estate in southern Wiltshire. Morrison took over the Fonthill Stud from his father in 1972, and had success in several classic horseraces.

Arms

References

1930 births
2003 deaths
Royal Wiltshire Yeomanry officers
British Life Guards officers
British landowners
2
Members of Wiltshire County Council
James
People educated at Ludgrove School
People educated at Eton College
Alumni of the Royal Agricultural University

Margadale